Ötigheim (Low Alemannic: Etje) is a town in the district of Rastatt in Baden-Württemberg in Germany. Its immediate neighbours are the towns of Bietigheim and Steinmauern.

Mayors

 1945-1955: Eugene Reuter (CDU)
 1976-2013: Werner Happold (CDU)
 Since 2013: Frank Kiefer

References

Rastatt (district)